Veyselli (former Karafakılı)  is a village in Erdemli district of Mersin Province, Turkey. The population of the village was 219   as of 2012. The village was founded 150 years ago by a Yörük (once nomadic Turkmen) chief named Veysel. In the 20th century a group of village residents moved to southeast to found Yeniyurt a neighbouring village. Later another group moved to Cyprus. Major economic activities are farming and animal breeding. Main produsts are tomato, apple peach, cereals.

References

Villages in Erdemli District